Denis Vaucher (18 February 1898 – 24 February 1993) was a cross country skier from Bern, Switzerland who competed in military patrol at the first winter Olympics in Chamonix in 1924.

The Swiss team, which consisted of Alfred Aufdenblatten, Alfons Julen, Anton Julen and Vaucher, finished first in the competition.

Vaucher was member of the Skiclub Bern, which was founded in 1900.

References

1898 births
1993 deaths
Swiss military patrol (sport) runners
Olympic biathletes of Switzerland
Military patrol competitors at the 1924 Winter Olympics
Olympic gold medalists for Switzerland
Medalists at the 1924 Winter Olympics
Sportspeople from Bern